Louis Jouffret (born 24 August 1995) is a French professional rugby league footballer who plays as a  for the Halifax Panthers in the RFL Championship and France at international level.

Playing career
He previously played for English clubs Batley Bulldogs, Featherstone Rovers, Whitehaven RLFC and French club Toulouse Olympique.

Ottawa Aces
He had signed with the Ottawa Aces before COVID-19 delayed their entry to League One until 2022.

SO Avignon
He signed for SO Avignon for the 2021 season

Whitehaven R.L.F.C.
On 26 Jun 2021 it was reported that he had signed for Whitehaven R.L.F.C. in the RFL Championship

Halifax Panthers
On 6 Nov 2021 it was reported that he had signed for Halifax Panthers in the RFL Championship

References

External links
France profile
Love Rugby League profile
French profile

1995 births
Living people
Batley Bulldogs players
Featherstone Rovers players
France national rugby league team players
French rugby league players
Halifax R.L.F.C. players
Rugby league five-eighths
Sporting Olympique Avignon players
Toulouse Olympique players
Whitehaven R.L.F.C. players